Denver Pavilions is a shopping mall located on the 16th Street Mall in Downtown Denver, Colorado. Originally opened in 1998, the mall has over 40 stores and restaurants. 

An open-air mall, the Pavilions takes advantage of Denver's many sunny days. In addition to retail stores, the mall hosts several chain restaurants, including Maggianos, Corner Bakery, Coyote Ugly Saloon, Lucky Strike Lanes, Hard Rock Cafe, and others. The mall also houses a popular, 15-screen movie theater, and there is a large, underground parking garage.

References

External links
Official website

Shopping malls in Colorado
Tourist attractions in Denver
Buildings and structures in Denver
Shopping malls established in 1998
1998 establishments in Colorado